Ariel Harush (or Harosh, ; born 25 May 1988) is an Israeli footballer who plays as a goalkeeper for Hapoel Be'er Sheva and the Israel national team.

Harush's time at Beitar Jerusalem was featured in the 2016 documentary Forever Pure, where he stood against racism and hate from the fans toward two new Muslim Chechnyan players. Harush was ultimately hounded out the club by the right-wing fanbase La Familia and left to play for Maccabi Netanya.

Early life
Harush was born in Jerusalem, Israel, to a Sephardic Jewish family.

Honours
 Beitar Jerusalem
State Cup (1): 2008-09
Toto Cup (1): 2009-10

Hapoel Be'er Sheva
State Cup (1): 2021–22
Super Cup (1): 2022

See also 
 List of Jewish footballers
 List of Jews in sports
 List of Israelis

References

External links
Twitter account

ONE profile 

1987 births
Living people
Israeli Sephardi Jews
Israeli footballers
Beitar Jerusalem F.C. players
Maccabi Netanya F.C. players
Hapoel Tel Aviv F.C. players
Hapoel Be'er Sheva F.C. players
Sparta Rotterdam players
FC Nitra players
SC Heerenveen players
Israeli Premier League players
Cypriot First Division players
Eredivisie players
Slovak Super Liga players
Israel under-21 international footballers
Israeli expatriate footballers
Expatriate footballers in Cyprus
Expatriate footballers in the Netherlands
Expatriate footballers in Slovakia
Israeli expatriate sportspeople in Cyprus
Israeli expatriate sportspeople in the Netherlands
Israeli expatriate sportspeople  in Slovakia
Israeli people of Moroccan-Jewish descent
Israel international footballers
Footballers from Jerusalem
Association football goalkeepers
Israeli Mizrahi Jews